Calconiscellus gottscheensis is a species of woodlouse in the family Trichoniscidae that can be found in Slovenia. It is listed as vulnerable on the IUCN Red List.

References

Woodlice
Animals described in 1927
Taxa named by Karl Wilhelm Verhoeff
Woodlice of Europe